Bunk Gardner (born John Leon Guarnera; May 2, 1933 in Cleveland, Ohio) is an American musician who most notably played for the original version of Frank Zappa's Mothers of Invention until the group disbanded in 1969. He plays woodwinds and tenor sax.

Career
Gardner started playing music at the age of seven by taking piano lessons. When he was a teenager he started playing the tenor sax. In 1959 he played with Bud Wattles & his Orchestra's album Themes from the Hip. Later he played with Joanna & the Playboys in 1962. By late 1966 Gardner had joined Frank Zappa & the Mothers of Invention, playing tenor sax and other woodwinds. The Mothers found success, with  Absolutely Free and We're Only in It for the Money entering the charts. In late 1968 his brother Buzz Gardner joined the Mothers, staying until the group disbanded a year later. Gardner played with Menage A Trois with Buzz and John Balkin. Later he recorded with Geronimo Black and the Grandmothers.

In 1980 Gardner and other members from the Mothers of Invention reunited to form the Grandmothers, recording a few albums and reuniting again in 2002. Gardner has done a few projects with Don Preston, a  member of the Mothers, making a few albums and touring with him.

Gardner also plays flute, piccolo, clarinet, bass clarinet, bassoon, and bass and soprano saxes.

Don Preston remains Gardner's close friend. In 2010 he recorded Gardner's autobiography (audiobook) "The Bunk Gardner Story" (featuring Don Preston), in Arthur Barrow's lotek studio, produced by Jon Larsen for Zonic Entertainment.

Personal life
Gardner married his wife Bonnie in 1977; the couple have two daughters.

Discography

With Frank Zappa and the Mothers of Invention 
 Absolutely Free
 We're Only in It for the Money
 Lumpy Gravy
 Cruising With Ruben & The Jets
 Uncle Meat
 Burnt Weeny Sandwich
 Weasels Ripped My Flesh
 You Can't Do That on Stage Anymore, Vol. 1
 You Can't Do That on Stage Anymore, Vol. 4
 You Can't Do That on Stage Anymore, Vol. 5
 Ahead of Their Time
 Mystery Disc
 Finer Moments
 Road Tapes Venue#1
 The Ark (BTB)
 Electric Aunt Jemima (BTB)
 Our Man in Nirvana (BTB).

With The Grandmothers 

 The Grandmothers (1981)
 Fan Club Talk (1981)
 Lookin Up Granny's Dress (1983)
 A Mother of Anthology (1993)
 Who Could Imagine? (1994)
 Eating The Astoria (2000)

With Geronimo Black 
 Geronimo Black – Uni – 1972
 Welcome Back Geronimo Black – Helios – 1980.

Bunk Gardner solo releases 
 It's All Bunk – Crossfire Productions 2007
 The Bunk Gardner Story – part one. Zonic Entertainment 2011
 The Bunk Gardner Story – part two. Zonic Entertainment 2011

References
http://www.united-mutations.com/g/bunk_gardner.htm
http://www.avantmusicnews.com/2010/03/10/don-preston-and-bunk-gardner-on-tour/

1933 births
Living people
Musicians from Cleveland
American saxophonists
American male saxophonists
American rock saxophonists
Musicians from Los Angeles
American flautists
American bassoonists
American clarinetists
The Mothers of Invention members
21st-century saxophonists
21st-century clarinetists
21st-century flautists